Ballyclare Comrades Football Club is a semi-professional, Northern Irish football club playing in the NIFL Championship. The club hails from Ballyclare, County Antrim and plays its home matches at Dixon Park. Club colours are red and white. The club's rivals are Carrick Rangers and Larne and games between the three clubs are referred to as "The East Antrim Derbies".

History
The club was founded in 1919 by veterans of the First World War, most of them from "C" Company of the 12th Royal Irish Rifles – a battalion made up entirely of East Antrim men, who fought at the Somme and in many other famous First World War battles. From 1990 until 2003, the club enjoyed senior status, but reverted to intermediate status when the Irish Premier League was established and the number of senior clubs was reduced.

The club's reserve team play in the NIFL Development League for under 20s. The club also has a partnership with local youth club Ballyclare Colts, whose sides (from under 11 to under 15) provide players to progress to Comrades' own youth sides at under-17 and under-18 level. The under-18 side play in the IFA Youth League.

The club was relegated to IFA Championship 2 in the 2010–11 season and finished in 6th place in the 2011–12 season, but the following season brought promotion back to Championship 1 after finishing as runners-up behind Championship 2 winners Knockbreda.
One of the club's most famous products was Northern Ireland and Sunderland defender Paddy McNair who attends games when possible. Gareth McAuley, now of Rangers, and Michael Smith (Hearts) both played for the Comrades before switching to professional football.

The club finished an impressive third in the 2016–17 season, losing out in a promotion playoff to Institute. The club continues with the ambition of getting back into the NIFL Premiership.

Current squad

Honours

Senior honours
Ulster Cup: 1
1997–98

Intermediate honours
Irish League B Division: 6
1960–61, 1962–63, 1973–74, 1977–78, 1979–80, 1988–89
IFA Intermediate League Second Division: 1
2006–07
Irish Intermediate Cup: 9
1925–26, 1949–50, 1950–51, 1953–54, 1959–60, 1960–61, 1962–63, 1963–64, 1989–90
B Division Knock-out Cup: 2
1983–84, 1988–89
George Wilson Cup: 4
1955–56, 1960–61, 1962–63, 1993–94†
Steel & Sons Cup: 6
1943–44, 1960–61, 1974–75, 1981–82, 1984–85, 1986–87
 McElroy Cup: 1
1941–42
Clarence Cup: 3
1980–81†, 1982–83†, 1983–84†

† Won by reserve team

References

External links
Ballyclare Comrades F.C. Website
 Irish Football Club Project
 nifootball.co.uk (fixtures, results and tables of all leagues)

 
Association football clubs established in 1919
Association football clubs in Northern Ireland
NIFL Championship clubs
Association football clubs in County Antrim
1919 establishments in Ireland